Wild Women is a 1918 American silent Western comedy film directed by John Ford and featuring Harry Carey. The film is considered to be lost.

Plot
As described in a film magazine, Cheyenne Harry (Carey) and his pals, bent on helping their friend Rawhide Jack, attend a rodeo with the intent to win the prize for roping steers and to hand the winnings over to Jack. Harry wins, and after the rodeo the boys go to a cafe where they imbibe too freely in the flowing wine and fall asleep. Harry finds himself robbed and with the others shanghaied and aboard a ship. They mutiny and Harry becomes the captain. A shipboard fire results in them landing on a desert island, where the Queen (Mattox) of the Blackanwhites falls in love with Harry. He dodges her and runs off with her daughter the Princess (Malone). Just as he starts making love to her, he awakens from a dream, the product of Harry's legendarily prodigious drinking, and discovers that he is holding one of the sleeping cowboys.

Cast
 Harry Carey as Cheyenne Harry
 Molly Malone as The Princess
 Martha Mattox as The Queen
 Ed Jones as Pelon (as Edward Jones)
 Vester Pegg as Pegg
 E. Van Beaver as The Boss
 Wilton Taylor as Slugger Joe (as Wilfred Taylor)

Production
Wild Women was a Universal Special release in February 1918. It was a silent film on five reels, part of the Western-themed "Cheyenne Harry" series of film featurettes.

Reception
Like many American films of the time, Wild Women was subject to cuts by city and state film censorship boards. For example, the Chicago Board of Censors required cuts in Reel 2 of the three first scenes of the young woman dancing on the stage and two closeups of young woman dancing on a table.

See also
 John Ford filmography
 Harry Carey filmography
 List of lost films

References

External links
 
 

1918 films
1918 lost films
1918 Western (genre) films
American black-and-white films
Films directed by John Ford
Lost American films
Lost Western (genre) films
Universal Pictures films
Silent American Western (genre) films
1910s American films